Tauberbischofsheim is a German town in the north-east of Baden-Württemberg on the river Tauber with a population of about 13,200. It is the capital of the Main-Tauber district. It is a popular tourist destination due to its numerous historical buildings, including substantial remains of the medieval town fortifications.

Tauberbischofsheim is also known for its fencers, who have won several Olympic medals and world championships.

Geography

Location
Tauberbischofsheim is located in the Tauberfranken region of Franconia on the river Tauber.

Constituent communities
Tauberbischofsheim consists of the main town of Tauberbischofsheim, as well as the Stadtteile Dienstadt, Distelhausen, Dittigheim, Dittwar, Hochhausen and Impfingen. The boundaries of these Stadtteile are the same as that of the former independent municipalities.

Dienstadt has 335 residents and is located west of Tauberbischofsheim. Distelhausen has 983 residents and is located south of Tauberbischofsheim. Dittigheim has 1042 residents and is located south of Tauberbischofsheim. Dittwar has 788 residents and is located south-west of Tauberbischofsheim. Hochhausen has 788 residents and is located north of Tauberbischofsheim. Impfingen has 788 residents and is located north of Tauberbischofsheim.

History

Prehistory
The area was settled at least since around 3000 B.C., based on prehistoric findings.

Middle Ages
The town was first mentioned in a biography of Saint Lioba in 836. It bears its name ("bishop's place") due to its close relation to bishop Saint Boniface. Boniface brought his relative Lioba to the town around 735, where she became abbess of a monastery. Boniface founded the convent at Bischofsheim. In 1180 the town's oldest building, the Chapel of St. Peter, was built. Between 1237 and 1245 town rights were granted to Tauberbischofsheim. Around 1280 the Türmersturm-tower and the Kurmainz Castle were constructed. In 1318 the Bischofsheim market was first mentioned in official records.

16th to 18th century
From 1525 to 1627 the town was denied self-rule after picking the losing side in the Peasant's War. New municipal laws were introduced by Albrecht, Archbishop of Mainz, severely restricting citizens' rights. In 1629 Franciscan friars settled in Bischofsheim. During the Thirty Years' War Bischofsheim was under Swedish occupation from 1631 to 1635. In 1688 a Latin school was founded by the Franciscans. Later the school became the Matthias-Grünewald Grammar School.

19th century
In 1803 Bischofsheim was placed under the rule of the Prince of Leiningen, after having been part of Kurmainz for over 560 years. In 1806 Bischofsheim joined the newly created Grand Duchy of Baden. In 1823 the Franciscan monastery (Klosterhof) was dissolved. Around 1850 the town became known as Tauberbischofsheim. To distinguish the town from other towns named Bischofsheim, the name of the river Tauber was added to the name. The new town hall was built between 1865 and 1867. In 1866, a battle in the Austro-Prussian War took place in and around Tauberbischofsheim between troops from Württemberg and Prussia. Between 1894-95 the "Christuskirche" was built as a Protestant church. From 1910 to 1914 the Catholic Church of St. Martin was reconstructed.

20th century
The six Stadtteile were incorporated to Tauberbischofsheim during the local government reform in Baden-Württemberg in the 1970s: July 1, 1971: Hochhausen and Impfingen (1 July 1971), Dienstadt (1 January 1972) and Distelhausen, Dittigheim and Dittwar (1 January 1975).

History of the Stadtteile

Governance

Mayors
The mayors of Tauberbischofsheim since 1945 were:
 1945–1946: August Haun
 1946–1952: August Otto Bruch
 1952–1958: Anton Baumann
 1958–1972: Walter Grosch
 1973–1980: Hans Dörfle
 1981–1995: Erich Hollerbach (CDU)
 1995-2019: Wolfgang Vockel
 since 2019: Anette Schmidt

Coat of Arms
In a red shield is a silver-white helmet crested by a wheel with seven spokes and attached by four ribbons ending in roses, all of the same colour. According to source the archbishopric of Mainz gained the village of Tauberbischofsheim in 1237 and the fiefdom of a castle in 1316. The archbishops were rulers of the city until 1802. The helmet is symbolizing this fiefdom. The image was taken from seals and was not changed until 1740. 1865 some elements had been added. Over time, the old version was re-established.

Arts and culture

Architecture

The old town, which was formerly completely surrounded by a defensive wall, features many historical buildings. The Tauberbischofsheim Castle dates back to second half of the 13th century. The marketplace is encircled by half-timbered houses and the Gothic Revival town hall. The parish church of St. Martin was completed in 1914 after its predecessor burnt down. The Gothic Revival church contains works of art from many past churches including an altar from the Ulm workshop of Niklaus Weckmann the Elder with panel paintings by Hans Schäufelein, a Madonna by Hans Multscher and a copy of the Tauberbischofsheim altarpiece by Matthias Grünewald. The oldest church in the city is the Peterskapelle, built in the 12th century. The Badischer Hof is the oldest hotel in Tauberbischofsheim. It was built in 1733.

For many years the town was home to the Tauberbischofsheim altarpiece, a monumental piece of German renaissance art by Master Mathis now kept in the Karlsruhe Kunsthalle.

Museums
In Tauberbischofsheim and its suburbs there are the following museums:
 Pharmacy Museum
 Farm Museum, Distelhausen
 Village Museum, Dittwar
 Village Museum, Impfingen
 School Furniture Museum, Tauberbischofsheim
 Tauber Franconian countryside museum in the Kurmainz Castle, Tauberbischofsheim

Regular events
Every May there is a traditional Maypole festival at Wörth square. In the same month there is an Italian Night at the market place.

The "Tauberbischofsheimer Altstadtfest" (old town festival) is traditionally on the first weekend of July, from Friday to Sunday.

During Advent, the traditional Tauberbischofsheim Christmas Market is a popular meeting place at the castle square.

Culinary specialties
Tauberbischofsheim and its environments are characterized in the lowlands by extensive fruit and wine growing areas. Here Tauber valley wines and sparkling wines are produced. Also beers (in the Distelhäuser brewery in the district Distelhausen), fruit brandies, regional cider and apple juice are produced. Regional specialties include Tauber trout, Boeuf de Hohenlohe, Tauber valley country pig products, Tauber valley lamb and regional Grünkern.

Sports

Fencing

The Fencing-Club Tauberbischofsheim (commonly known as FC Tauberbischofsheim) is the most successful fencing club in the world, based on its medal successes in international sporting events. Medalists have included Thomas Bach, Matthias Behr, Anja Fichtel, Zita Funkenhauser, Jürgen Hehn, Harald Hein and Alexander Pusch. The FC Tauberbischofsheim is based at the Tauberbischofsheim Olympic team training camp for the sport of fencing.

Other sports
The TSV 1863 Tauberbischofsheim e. V is a popular sports club with 2,304 members (as of 2 October 2014) with eleven different departments for the following sports: Football (soccer), Judo, Gymnastics, Badminton, Basketball, Table tennis, Tennis, Rock n roll, Volleyball, Handball and Karate.

Economy

Tourism
Tauberbischofsheim is located on the Romantic Road, a tourist route that connects many scenic cities and towns. The Romantic Road is the oldest tourist route in Germany. Tauberbischofsheim is also part of the Siegfried Road.

Others
Diestelhausen is home to the Distelhäuser Brewery.

Infrastructure

Transport
The Taubertalradweg along the Tauber River connects Tauberbischofsheim in one direction with Bad Mergentheim and Rothenburg ob der Tauber (in the other direction with Wertheim).

Health
Tauberbischofsheim's hospital has a public indoor pool with sauna and exercise pool.

The solar-heated Frankenbad is a municipal swimming pool.

Education
The Christian-Morgenstern-Grundschule and the Grundschule am Schloss are the primary schools in Tauberbischofsheim.

Tauberbischofsheim operates one college-track high school (Matthias-Grünewald-Gymnasium) and two non-college-track high schools (Riemenschneider-Realschule, Pestalozzi-Werkrealschule). There is also one special-education school run by the town (Christophorus-Förderschule).

The Kaufmännische Schule Tauberbischofsheim (with Wirtschaftsgymnasium) and the Gewerbliche Schule Tauberbischofsheim are vocational schools or professional training schools run by the Main-Tauber-Kreis.

There are also two private schools: Volkshochschule Mittleres Taubertal e.V. and Euro Akademie Tauberbischofsheim.

Notable people

Honorary citizen
 Emil Beck, (1935 – 2006), national fencing team head coach of Germany for numerous Olympic games and world championships
 Thomas Bach, (born 1953), since 2013 the ninth and current president of the IOC

Other people
 Leoba, (c. 710–782), established a convent in Tauberbischofsheim, where she became the abbess
 Jakob Löwenstein (1799–1869), rabbi and writer
 Richard Trunk (1879–1968), composer
 Reinhold Behr (born 1948), fencer
 Harald Hein (1950–2008), Olympic champion and world champion in fencing
 Hanns Jana (born 1952), fencer
 Matthias Behr (born 1955), Olympic champion and world champion in fencing
 Alexander Pusch (born 1955), Olympic champion and world champion in épée fencing
 Sabine Bischoff (1958–2013), fencer
 Gerald Ehrmann (born 1959), football goalkeeper
 Mathias Gey (born 1960), fencer
 Ulrich Schreck (born 1962), Olympic champion and world champion in fencing
 Anja Fichtel (born 1968), Olympic champion and world champion in fencing

References

Further reading
 Specialised books, scientific books
 Gerhard Finger, Erwin Heisswolf, Albert Krämer, Helmuth Lauf, Edgar Münch, Roland Veith: Tauberfranken: Lebensformen und Gesellschaftsordnung im Mittelalter. Fränkische Nachrichten, Tauberbischofsheim 1998, .
 Carlheinz Gräter: Tauberbischofsheim. Fränkisch-Schwäbischer Heimatverlag, Oettingen 1968.
 Julius Berberich: Geschichte der Stadt Tauberbischofsheim und des Amtsbezirks. Mit einem Stadtplane vom Jahre 1790. M. Zöller’s Buchhandlung und Buchdruckerei, Tauberbischofsheim 1895 (Faksimile-Druck: Fränkische Nachrichten Druck- und Verlags-GmbH, Tauberbischofsheim 1984).
 Hugo Stang, Anton Ullrich, Wilhelm Ogiermann, Josef Kiefer, August Haun: Tauberbischofsheim. Aus der Geschichte einer alten Amtsstadt. Eigenverlag der Stadtverwaltung, Tauberbischofsheim 1955 (Chronik ohne die Zeit 1600 bis 1800).
 Gernot Wamser: Tauberbischofsheim. Sutton, Erfurt 2005, .
 Corinna Egerer, Michael Latzel: Tauberbischofsheim. Fränkische Nachrichten, Tauberbischofsheim 2005, .
 Franz Gehrig, Hermann Müller: Tauberbischofsheim. Verein Tauberfränkische Heimatfreunde e. V., Tauberbischofsheim 1997 (Schwerpunkt der Chronik: 1600 bis 1900).
 Dietrich Barsch, Werner Fricke, Peter Meusburger, Ulrich Wagner: Tauberbischofsheim und Bad Mergentheim. Eine Analyse der Raumbeziehungen zweier Städte in der frühen Neuzeit. Universität Heidelberg: Geographisches Institut, Heidelberg 1985, .
 Emil Beck (Editor), Berndt Barth (Editor): The Complete Guide to Fencing, 366 pages, Publisher Meyer & Meyer, Aachen 2006, .
 Manfred Maninger: Chronik der Gemeinde Dittwar. Heimat- und Kulturverein Dittwar e. V., Dittwar 1968.
 Elmar Weiß: Dittigheim: Eine alte Siedlung im Taubertal. Interessengemeinschaft Heimatbuch Dittigheim, Tauberbischofsheim 1987.

 Guides and maps
 Landesamt für Geoinformation und Landentwicklung Baden-Württemberg: Tauberbischofsheim: Bauland Unteres Taubertal. Landkarte. Freizeitkarte 1:50.000. LGL, Stuttgart 2009, .
 Landesamt für Geoinformation und Landentwicklung Baden-Württemberg: Bad Mergentheim Tauberbischofsheim: Wanderkarte. Landkarte 1:35.000. LGL, Stuttgart 2009, .
 Südwestrundfunk (ed.): Tour de Ländle 2012 : 27. Juli bis 3. August - die komplette Route von Tauberbischofsheim bis zum Europa-Park in Rust. Hampp-Verlag, Stuttgart 2012, .
 Bikeline: Liebliches Taubertal: Der Klassiker - Der Sportive: Zwischen Rothenburg ob der Tauber und Wertheim. Esterbauer, Rodingersdorf 2013, .

 Fairy tales and legends
 Hans Werner Siegel (ed.), Hugo Pahl: Zwischen Tag und Dunkel: Sagen u. Geschichten aus dem Taubergrund. Verein Tauberfränkische Heimatfreunde e.V., Tauberbischofsheim 1982.

 Directory and bibliography
 Richard Möll: Die Fecht-Legende von Tauberbischofsheim. Verlag Laub, Elztal-Dallau 1987, .
 Claudia Wieland, Peter Müller: Hospital Tauberbischofsheim 1333–1965: Inventar des Bestands LRA 50 im Archiv des Main-Tauber-Kreises. Kohlhammer, Stuttgart 2000, .
 Thomas Müller, Romana Schneider: Das Klassenzimmer vom Ende des 19. Jahrhunderts bis heute / The classroom from the late 19th century until the present day: Das Katalogbuch zum VS-Schulmuseum in Tauberbischofsheim. Wasmuth, Tübingen 2010, . (englisch)

External links

 Official site of Tauberbischofsheim (in German).

Historic Jewish communities
Main-Tauber-Kreis
Baden